The 1992 Carleton Knights football team represented Carleton College in the 1992 NCAA Division III football season. Bob Sullivan returned as the head coach, and Gerald Young was hired as the team's new defensive coordinator.

The Knights had 19 players return from the 1991 season, with Scott Hanks moving from running back to tight end.

The team scored 287 points (including 34 touchdowns and eight field goals) and totaled 3,757 yards of total offense in 10 regular season games, consisting of 1,732 rushing yards and 2,025 passing yards. It totaled 4,892 all-purpose yards. On defense, the team totaled a school record 1,034 tackles, including 107 tackles for loss.  It also recorded 41 quarterback sacks and 17 interceptions for a school record 288 interception return yards.

Schedule

Game summaries
On September 12, 1992, Carleton won its season opener against Northwestern College by a 49–3 score. Ted Kluender threw two touchdown passes as Carleton secured the 400th win in program history.

On September 19, 1992, Carleton defeated the Hamline Pipers, 36–0, at Laird Stadium in Northfield, Minnesota. Tight end Scott Hanks caught seven passes for 133 yards and two touchdowns.  The Carleton defense held Hamline to minus-one rushing yards on 34 attempts. Carleton linebacker Barry Burch returned an interception for a touchdown in the third quarter and Hamline's Mike Bjork recorded 17 tackles.

On September 26, 1992, Carleton defeated the Bethel Royals, 24–14. Ted Kluender threw two touchdown passes, ran for a third, and completed 16 of 30 passes for 220 yards and two touchdowns. Prior to the Bethel game, Carleton's defense had not allowed a touchdown and was ranked third in NCAA Division III.

On October 3, 1992, Carleton defeated the St. Thomas Tommies, 25–20, before a homecoming crowd of 6,000. Adam Henry rushed for 137 yards and a touchdown, and Scott Hanks caught nine passes for 150 yards. Aston Coleman also returned an interception for a touchdown. The team's 4–0 start to the season was Carleton's best start to a football season since 1957.

On October 10, 1992, Carleton defeated the Macalester Scots, 32–6. Adam Henry rushed for 115 yards and a touchdown.  Ted Kluender threw two touchdown passes.

On October 17, 1992, Carleton defeated its rival St. Olaf, 21–9. Adam Henry carried 40 times for 228 rushing yards and three touchdowns, and Dave Keenan caught six passes for 151 yards for St. Olaf. Barry Burch blocked two St. Olaf kicks. With the victory, Carleton retained the Goat trophy, awarded annually to the winner of the Carleton-St. Olaf football game.

On October 24, 1992, Carleton defeated Concordia, 26–24. Carleton's Aston Coleman blocked a field goal attempt with nine seconds remaining in the game. Art Gilliland tied a Carleton single-game record with 23 tackles in the game.

On October 31, 1992, Carleton defeated Augsburg, 38–28.  Adam Henry rushed for 163 yards and two touchdowns to break the Carleton single season rushing record. Scott Hanks also tied the school's single-game record with 13 catches for 136 yards and two touchdowns.

On November 7, 1992, Carleton lost to John Gagliardi's St. John's Johnnies by a stunning 70–7 score at the Metrodome. The Johnnies totaled 419 yards of total offense while Carleton was held to 201 yards.  St. John's scored seven touchdowns in the first half to lead 49-0.

On Friday, November 13, 1992, Carleton secured the MIAC championship with a 21–20 victory over Gustavus Adolphus at the Metrodome. Gustavus scored a late touchdown with a chance to tie the game, but unsuccessfully tried for a two-point conversion to win the game.

On November 21, 1992, Carleton lost, 20–8, to Ron Schipper's Central College team in the first round of the Division III West Region playoffs.  The game was played in Pella, Iowa. Ted Kluender completed 14 of 45 passes and was intercepted six times. Scott Hanks scored Carleton's only touchdown on a 16-yard pass from Kluender with one second remaining in the first half.

Records and honors
Halfback Adam Henry set a school record with 2,035 all-purpose yards and 249 rushing attempts (1,244 yards).  Henry was only the second Carleton player to rush for 1,000 yards in a season. Henry concluded his Carleton career in 1993 with a school record 3,482 rushing yards. His 1992 total of 1,244 rushing yards stood as a Carleton single-season record until 2003 when Erik Fisher rushed for 1,423 yards. His 249 rushing attempts in 1992 remains a Carleton record.

Aston Coleman also set a Carleton single-season record with 129 interception return yards.

At the end of the season, Bob Sullivan won the MIAC Coach of the Year award. Six Carleton players were named by conference coaches to the All-MIAC football team: Aston Coleman, Art Gilliland, Scott Hanks, Adam Henry, Geoff Morse, and Watie White. Hanks was also selected by the College Sports Information Directors of America as a first-team tight end on the 1992 GTE College Division Academic All-American team.

Roster

References

External links
 1992 season video

Carleton
Carleton Knights football seasons
Minnesota Intercollegiate Athletic Conference football champion seasons
Carleton Knights football